Apariencias is a 2000 Argentine romantic comedy film directed by Alberto Lecchi and starring Andrea del Boca and Adrián Suar. It was written by Gustavo Belatti and Mario Segade, based on an idea by Adrián Suar. The film was screened in the US in May 2001 and released on DVD in 2004.

Plot summary
Carmelo is 30 years old and extremely shy. He is in love with his co-worker Verónica, but finds it difficult to reveal his feelings to her. She is sent to work abroad for three months, and when she announces her return, Carmelo decides to meet her at the airport, accompanied by his friend Beto, and confess that he loves her. However, the woman returns with a handsome boyfriend, Federico, whom she is engaged to. Carmello is heartbroken and upon leaving the airport, he is accidentally entangled with a gay rally. In an odd twist of fate, Verónica spots Carmelo and assumes that he himself is gay. He doesn't correct the wrong impression and takes advantage of this misunderstanding to get closer to her. They start working on a project together and Verónica falls for Carmelo.

Cast
 Adrián Suar as Carmelo Posse
 Andrea del Boca as Verónica Ortiz
 Diego Pérez as Beto
 Fabián Mazzei as Federico
 Rita Cortese as Susana Posse
 Fernando Siro as Orlando Posse
 Jorge Rivera López as Esteban Ortiz
 Lucrecia Capello as Elsa Ortiz
 Favio Posca as Iñaqui
 Natalia Lobo as Betty
 Lidia Catalano as Delfina
 Rolo Puente as Nicosi
 Gabo Correa as Blanco
 Pablo Ini as Samilian
 Joselo Bella
 Eduardo Narvay
 Osvaldo Guidi
 Sebastián Pajoni
 Gabriel Kraisman

References

External links
 

2000 romantic comedy films
Argentine LGBT-related films
Films directed by Alberto Lecchi
2000s Spanish-language films
Argentine romantic comedy films
LGBT-related romantic comedy films
2000 LGBT-related films
2000 films
2000s Argentine films